Cuban Pete is a 1946 black-and-white musical comedy film released in the United States. It was directed by Jean Yarbrough and starred the Cuban-born actor and musician Desi Arnaz.

The film with a simple comedy plot contains many numbers of Cuban music and dance, including the song of the same name by Joseph Norman. It was used in the television show I Love Lucy (episodes: "The Diet," with Lucille Ball as Sally Sweet and "Lucy Goes to a Rodeo" as an alternative version, "Texas Pete") and in the 1994 film The Mask.

Accolades

American Film Institute recognition

 2004: AFI's 100 Years...100 Songs:	
 "Cuban Pete" – Nominated

References

External links
 
 

1946 films
1946 musical comedy films
American musical comedy films
American black-and-white films
1940s English-language films
Films directed by Jean Yarbrough
Films set in Cuba
Films set in New York City
Universal Pictures films
1940s American films